Ban-e Sarv (also Romanized as Bān-e Sarv and Bān Sarv; also known as Sarv Şūl) is a village in Arkavazi Rural District, Chavar District, Ilam County, Ilam Province, Iran. At the 2006 census, its population was 244, in 51 families. The village is populated by Kurds.

References 

Populated places in Ilam County
Kurdish settlements in Ilam Province